FACE TV or FACE TV HD is a Bosnian commercial HDTV television channel based in Sarajevo. The founder of Face TV is the Bosnian journalist, news anchor and TV host Senad Hadžifejzović. It has started broadcasting its own experimental programs on January 15, 2012.
The programs are broadcast in HD 24 hours a day in Bosnian. Its television studio is located at the top of the Bosmal City Center in Sarajevo.

Current programming line-up
This television channel broadcasts a variety of programs such as news, talk shows, entertainment and sport magazines, movies and documentaries.

News program
 Euronews - As the exclusive Bosnian partner of Euronews, Face TV broadcasts its latest news bulletins in English (every day from 4:30 pm to 5:30 pm)
 Redakcija – Newsroom themed information program that airs before the main news program (at 6:45 pm)
 Dnevnik – main news program broadcast every night at 7:15 pm (with sport and weather bulletins)
 Face to Face - talk show hosted by Senad Hadžifejzović (broadcast on Friday and Saturday)
 Centralni Dnevnik - news program hosted by Senad Hadžifejzović

Entertainment program
 Star in the car - Program in which celebrities are interviewed by  while she's driving. The program aired also on N1.

References

External links
 Official website
 Communications Regulatory Agency of Bosnia and Herzegovina

Mass media in Sarajevo
Television stations in Bosnia and Herzegovina
Television channels and stations established in 2012